Gondar, also spelled Gonder (Amharic: ጎንደር, Gonder or Gondär; formerly , Gʷandar or Gʷender), is a city and woreda in Ethiopia. Located in the North Gondar Zone of the Amhara Region, Gondar is north of Lake Tana on the Lesser Angereb River and southwest of the Simien Mountains. , Gondar has an estimated population of 443,156. 

Gondar previously served as the capital of both the Ethiopian Empire and the subsequent Begemder Province. The city holds the remains of several royal castles, including those in the Fasil Ghebbi UNESCO World Heritage Site for which Gondar has been called the "Camelot of Africa".

History

Origins 

Until the 16th century, the Solomonic Emperors of Ethiopia usually had no fixed capital town, but instead lived in tents in temporary royal camps as they moved around their realms while their family, bodyguard and retinue devoured surplus crops and cut down nearby trees for firewood. One exception to this rule was Debre Berhan, founded by Zara Yaqob in 1456; Tegulet in Shewa was also essentially the capital during the first century of Solomonic rule. Gondar was founded by Emperor Fasilides around the year 1635, and grew as an agricultural and market town. There was a superstition at the time that the capital's name should begin with the letter 'Gʷa' (modern pronunciation 'Gʷe'; Gonder was originally spelt Gʷandar), which also contributed to Gorgora's (founded as Gʷargʷara) growth in the centuries after 1600. Tradition also states that a buffalo led the Emperor Fasilides to a pool beside the Angereb, where an "old and venerable hermit" told the Emperor he would locate his capital there. Fasilides had the pool filled in and built his castle on that same site. The emperor also built a total of seven churches; the first two, Fit Mikael and Qedus Abbo, were built to end local epidemics. The five emperors who followed him also built their palaces in the town.

16th century
Beginning with Emperor Menas in 1559, the rulers of Ethiopia began spending the rainy season near Lake Tana, often returning to the same location each year. These encampments, which flourished as cities for a short time, include Emfraz, Ayba, Gorgora and Dankaz.

17th century 

In 1668, as a result of a church council, the Emperor Yohannes I ruled that the inhabitants of Gondar were to be segregated by religion. This caused the Muslims and Jews to move into their own quarters within two years. These quarters came to be known as Addis Alem ("New World") and Kayla Mayda (plain of Kayla).

During the seventeenth century, the city's population is estimated to have exceeded 60,000. Many of the buildings from this period survive, despite the turmoil of the eighteenth century. By the reign of Iyasu the Great, Gondar had acquired a sense of community identity.

19th century 
The town served as Ethiopia's capital until Tewodros II moved the Imperial capital to Debra Tabor in 1856, and Gondar becoming a "city of Priests"; Tewodros II plundered and burnt the city in 1864, then devastated it again in December, 1866. Abdallahi ibn Muhammad sacked Gondar when he invaded Ethiopia June 1887 and was ravaged by Sudanese invaders that set fire to almost every one of the city's churches. Lastly, it was bombed by the British trying to clear out Fascist Italians during WWII.

20th century 
After the military occupation of Ethiopia by the Kingdom of Italy in 1936, Gondar was further developed under Italian occupation, and the Comboni missionaries established in 1937 the Latin Catholic Apostolic Prefecture of Gondar, which would be suppressed after the death of its only prefect in 1951.

During the Second World War, Mussolini's Italian forces made their last stand in Gondar in November 1941, after Addis Ababa fell to British forces six months before. The area of Gondar was one of the main centers of activity of Italian guerrilla against the British forces until summer 1943.

During the Ethiopian Civil War, the forces of the Ethiopian Democratic Union gained control of large parts of Begemder, and during parts of 1977 operated within a few kilometers of Gondar, and appeared to be at the point of capturing the city. As part of Operation Tewodros near the end of the Civil War, Gondar was captured by the Ethiopian People's Revolutionary Democratic Front in March 1991.

Cityscape

Gondar traditionally was divided into several neighborhoods or quarters: Addis Alem, where the Muslim inhabitants dwelt; Kayla Mayda, where the adherents of Beta Israel lived; Abun Bet, centered on the residence of the Abuna, or nominal head of the Ethiopian Church; and Qagn Bet, home to the nobility. Gondar is also a noted center of ecclesiastical learning of the Ethiopian Orthodox Tewahedo Church, and known for having 44 churches – for many years more than any other settlement in Ethiopia. Gondar and its surrounding countryside constitute the homeland of most Ethiopian Jews.

The modern city of Gondar is popular as a tourist destination for its many picturesque ruins in Fasil Ghebbi (the Royal Enclosure), from which the emperors once reigned. The most famous buildings in the city lie in the Royal Enclosure, which include Fasilides' castle, Iyasu's palace, Dawit's Hall, a banqueting hall, stables, Empress Mentewab's castle, a chancellery, library and three churches. Near the city lie Fasilides' Bath, home to an annual ceremony where it is blessed and then opened for bathing; the Qusquam complex, built by Empress Mentewab; the eighteenth century Ras Mikael Sehul's Palace and the Debre Berhan Selassie Church.

Downtown Gondar shows the influence of the Italian occupation of the late 1930s. The main piazza features shops, a cinema, and other public buildings in a simplified Italian Moderne style still distinctively of the period despite later changes and, frequently, neglect. Villas and flats in the nearby quarter that once housed occupation officials and colonists are also of interest.

Education 
The town is home to the University of Gondar, which includes Ethiopia's main faculty of medicine. Teda Health Science College is also located at this town.

Demographics

Based on the 2007 national census conducted by the Central Statistical Agency of Ethiopia (CSA), the woreda had a total population of 207,044, an increase of 84.45% from the 1994 census, of whom 98,120 were male and 108,924 female. A total of 53,725 households were counted in this woreda, resulting in an average of 3.85 persons to a household, and 50,818 housing units. The majority of the inhabitants practiced Ethiopian Orthodox Christianity, with 84.15% reporting that as their religion, while 11.77% of the population said they were Muslim.

The 1994 national census reported a total population for this woreda of 112,249 in 22,932 households, of whom 51,366 were male and 60,883 female. The three largest ethnic groups reported in Gondar were the Amhara (88.91%), Tigrayans (6.74%), and Qemant (2.37%); all other ethnic groups made up 1.98% of the population. Amharic was spoken as a first language by 94.57% of the population and Tigrinya was spoken as a first language by 4.67% of the population; the remaining 0.76% spoke all other primary languages reported. 83.31% practiced Ethiopian Orthodox Christianity, and 15.83% of the population said they were Muslim.

Documentation with 3D laser scanners 
The Zamani Project documented Fasil Ghebbi in the center of Gondar with terrestrial 3D laser scanning. The structures documented include: the Castle of Emperor Fasilides, the Bakaffa Castle, Dawit III's Hall, the Castle of Emperor Iyasu, the Royal Library, the Chancellery, the Royal Archive Building .

Some of the textured 3D models, a panorama tour, elevations, sections and plans are available on www.zamaniproject.org.

Transport
Air transport is served by Gondar Airport (ICAO code HAGN, IATA GDQ), also known as Atse Tewodros Airport, after the Emperor of Ethiopia (Atse) Tewodros. Travel within Gondar is mostly done by mini-buses and 3-wheeler motorcycles (accommodating 3–4 passengers).

Intercity bus service is provided by the Selam Bus Line Share Company and Sky Bus Transport System, as well as independently owned buses that depart from the town bus station.

Climate
The climate of Gondar is mild, temperate to warm, with an average temperature of 20 °C year round. Köppen-Geiger climate classification system classifies its climate as subtropical highland (Cwb).

Sister cities
As designated by Sister Cities International, Gondar is a sister city with:

  Corvallis, Oregon, United States
 Florence, Italy
  Rishon LeZion, Israel

Notable people 

Abby Lakew
Aster Aweke: singer
Eténèsh Wassié: singer and Azmari
Haile Gerima
Yityish Titi Aynaw: Miss Israel 2013
Fasil Demoz: Singer
Fano Mesafint: Fano Dereje: Fano Demeke: Fano Agaye: Fano Selomon: Fano Arega: Freedom Fighters
Tamagn Beyene: Humanitarian and Freedom Fighter

See also 

 List of Gondarine churches
 Gultosh – a deserted village near Gondar
 Azezo – a nearby village south of Gondar

Notes

References

External links

 
 Ethiopian Treasures – Fasilados Castle, Felasha Village – Gonder 
 Pictures from Gonder

 
Districts of Amhara Region
Former national capitals
Historic Jewish communities in Ethiopia
Populated places established in the 1630s
17th-century establishments in Ethiopia
Cities and towns in Ethiopia
Ethiopia